Mountain View may refer to:

Australia 
 Mountain View, Queensland, a neighbourhood in Killarney in the Southern Downs Region

Canada
Mountain View, Alberta, a hamlet in Cardston County
Mountain View County, a municipal district in Alberta
Mountain View, Ontario, a community in Prince Edward County
Rural Municipality of Mountain View No. 318, Saskatchewan

South Africa
Mountain View, Johannesburg, a suburb of Johannesburg
Mountain View, Pretoria, a suburb in the Central Western region of Pretoria

United States
 Mountain View, Anchorage, a neighborhood in Alaska
 Mountain View, Arkansas
 Mountain View, California, a city in Santa Clara County and the most populous place with this name
 Magalia, California or Mountain View, in Butte County
 Mountain View, Contra Costa County, California, near Martinez
 Mountain View Acres, California, San Bernardino County
 Mountain View, Colorado
 Mountain View, Georgia
 Mountain View, Hawaii
 Mountain View, Missouri
 Mountainview, Mercer County, New Jersey, an unincorporated community in Ewing
 Mountain View, Chaves County, New Mexico, an unincorporated community
 Mountain View, Cibola County, New Mexico, a census-designated place
 Mountain View, Luna County, New Mexico, a census-designated place
 Mountain View, North Carolina
 Mountain View, Oklahoma
 Mountain View, Oregon
 Mountain View, El Paso, Texas
 Mountain View, Roanoke, Virginia, a neighborhood
 Mountain View, Tennessee
 Mountain View, Washington
 Mountain View, Wyoming
 Mountain View, Natrona County, Wyoming

Other uses
 Mountain View Park (New Jersey), a park in Middlesex
 Mountain View (NJT station), a New Jersey Transit train station in Wayne
 Mountain View (Morganton, North Carolina),  a historic plantation house
 Mountain View Unit, a prison in Gatesville, Texas
 Mountain View (Chatham, Virginia), a historic home
 Mountain View (Roanoke, Virginia), a historic home
 Mountain View Homestead and General Store, a historic building in Wisemans Creek, New South Wales, Australia
 Mountain View, Richmond, a historic home in Richmond, New South Wales, Australia

See also 
 Overlook, a high place where people can gather to view scenery
 Mountain View Acres, California, in San Bernardino County
 Mountain View at Edinboro
 Mountain View Cemetery (disambiguation)
 Mountain View Elementary School (disambiguation)
 Mountain View Farm (disambiguation)
 Mountain View High School (disambiguation)
 Mountain View Hotel (disambiguation)
 Mountain View, a preserved View series railcar